Bogodan Olezek was a Polish Politician who served as the Chairman of the City Council of Gdańsk from 2001 to 2018.

References 

1948 births
Living people
20th-century Polish politicians
21st-century Polish politicians
Politicians from Warsaw
Civic Platform politicians
Mayors of Gdańsk